is a Japanese voice actress currently associated with the Ricomotion voice actor agency. Sogi is noted for her role as Mai Shiranui in the Fatal Fury, Capcom vs. SNK and King of Fighters fighting game series (which she also revoiced in The King of Fighters: Another Day anime). Although mainly only recognized for her role as Mai, Sogi is a prolific actress in various other entertainment fields. She has appeared in Japanese TV dramas, live-action movies and stage plays, and has made appearances in a few television commercials.

Filmography

Anime
The King of Fighters: Another Day (2005) – Mai Shiranui

Video games
 Fatal Fury 2 (1992) – Mai Shiranui
 Fatal Fury Special (1993) – Mai Shiranui
 The King of Fighters '94 (1994) – Mai Shiranui
 Fatal Fury 3: Road to the Final Victory (1995) – Mai Shiranui
 The King of Fighters '95 (1995) – Mai Shiranui
 Real Bout Fatal Fury (1995) – Mai Shiranui
 The King of Fighters '96 (1996) – Mai Shiranui
 Real Bout Fatal Fury Special (1997) – Mai Shiranui
 The King of Fighters '97 (1997) – Mai Shiranui
 Real Bout Fatal Fury 2: The Newcomers (1998) – Mai Shiranui
 The King of Fighters '98 (1998) – Mai Shiranui
 Fatal Fury: Wild Ambition (1999) – Mai Shiranui
 The King of Fighters '99 (1999) – Mai Shiranui
 The King of Fighters 2000 (2000) – Mai Shiranui
 Capcom vs. SNK: Millennium Fight 2000 (2000) – Mai Shiranui
 Capcom vs. SNK 2: Millionaire Fighting 2001 (2001) – Mai Shiranui
 The King of Fighters 2001 (2001) – Mai Shiranui
 The King of Fighters 2002 (2002) – Mai Shiranui
 SNK vs. Capcom: SVC Chaos (2003) – Mai Shiranui
 The King of Fighters 2003 (2003) – Mai Shiranui
 The King of Fighters: Maximum Impact (2004) – Mai Shiranui
 The King of Fighters NeoWave (2005) – Mai Shiranui
 NeoGeo Battle Coliseum (2005) – Mai Shiranui
 The King of Fighters XI (2005) – Mai Shiranui
 The King of Fighters: Maximum Impact 2 (2006) – Mai Shiranui

References

External links
Akoya Sogi at MobyGames 
Akoya Sogi at Ricomotion 

 

Sogi Akoya
Sogi Akoya
Sogi Akoya
Sogi Akoya
Sogi Akoya
Sogi Akoya
Sogi Akoya
Sogi Akoya
Sogi Akoya